Maison Van Gogh (or Van Gogh House) is a museum in the village of Cuesmes, near Mons in Belgium. Vincent van Gogh lived here from 1879 to 1880.

Background
Cuesmes is in the Borinage, at that time a coal-mining area; Vincent van Gogh came here in 1879 as a layman preacher. He became concerned about the lives of the miners, and went down into the mines. The Belgian Union of Protestant Churches, dissatisfied with this involvement, dismissed him after six months, but he continued without pay.

During this period, from 1879 to 1880, he stayed in the annexe of a house in Cuesmes occupied by a miner named Decrucq and his family. From there he wrote to his brother Theo that he was considering what purpose he could give to his life; inspired by the lives of the miners, he started to produce drawings. From 1880, he started painting in earnest.

See also
 Vincent van Gogh chronology

References

 

Museums with year of establishment missing
Van Gogh, Maison
Historic house museums in Belgium
Museums in Hainaut (province)
Vincent van Gogh
Van Gogh, Maison